In mathematics, the Ornstein–Uhlenbeck process is a stochastic process with applications in financial mathematics and the physical sciences. Its original application in physics was as a model for the velocity of a massive Brownian particle under the influence of friction. It is named after Leonard Ornstein and George Eugene Uhlenbeck.

The Ornstein–Uhlenbeck process is a stationary Gauss–Markov process, which means that it is a Gaussian process, a Markov process, and is temporally homogeneous.  In fact, it is the only nontrivial process that satisfies these three conditions, up to allowing linear transformations of the space and time variables. Over time, the process tends to drift towards its mean function: such a process is called mean-reverting.

The process can be considered to be a modification of the random walk in continuous time, or Wiener process, in which the properties of the process have been changed so that there is a tendency of the walk to move back towards a central location, with a greater attraction when the process is further away from the center. The Ornstein–Uhlenbeck process can also be considered as the continuous-time analogue of the discrete-time AR(1) process.

Definition 

The Ornstein–Uhlenbeck process  is defined by the following stochastic differential equation:

An additional drift term is sometimes added:

where  is a constant.
The Ornstein–Uhlenbeck process is sometimes also written as a Langevin equation of the form

where , also known as white noise, stands in for the supposed derivative  of the Wiener process. However,  does not exist because the Wiener process is nowhere differentiable, and so the Langevin equation is, strictly speaking, only heuristic. In physics and engineering disciplines, it is a common representation for the Ornstein–Uhlenbeck process and similar stochastic differential equations by tacitly assuming that the noise term is a derivative of a differentiable (e.g. Fourier) interpolation of the Wiener process.

Fokker–Planck equation representation 

The Ornstein–Uhlenbeck process can also be described in terms of a probability density function, which specifies the probability of finding the process in the state  at time . This function satisfies the Fokker–Planck equation

 

where . This is a linear parabolic partial differential equation which can be solved by a variety of techniques. The transition probability, also known as the Green's function,  is a Gaussian with mean  and variance :

 

This gives the probability of the state  occurring at time  given initial state  at time . Equivalently,  is the solution of the Fokker–Planck equation with initial condition .

Mathematical properties 

 
and the covariance is

The Ornstein–Uhlenbeck process is an example of a Gaussian process that has a bounded variance and admits a stationary probability distribution, in contrast to the Wiener process; the difference between the two is in their "drift" term. For the Wiener process the drift term is constant, whereas for the Ornstein–Uhlenbeck process it is dependent on the current value of the process: if the current value of the process is less than the (long-term) mean, the drift will be positive; if the current value of the process is greater than the (long-term) mean, the drift will be negative. In other words, the mean acts as an equilibrium  level for the process. This gives the process its informative name, "mean-reverting."

Properties of sample paths 

A temporally homogeneous Ornstein–Uhlenbeck process can be represented as a scaled, time-transformed Wiener process:

where  is the standard Wiener process. Equivalently, with the change of variable  this becomes

For instance, the law of the iterated logarithm for  becomes

Formal solution 

The stochastic differential equation for  can be formally solved by variation of parameters. Writing

 

we get

 

 

whereupon we see

 

From this representation, the first moment (i.e. the mean) is shown to be

 

assuming  is constant. Moreover, the Itō isometry can be used to calculate the covariance function by

 

Since the Itô integral of deterministic integrand is normally distributed, it follows that

Numerical sampling 

By using discretely sampled data at time intervals of width , the maximum likelihood estimators for the parameters of the Ornstein–Uhlenbeck process are asymptotically normal to their true values. More precisely,

Numerical simulation 
To simulate an OU process numerically with standard deviation  and correlation time , one method is to apply the finite-difference formula

where  is a normally distributed random number with zero mean and unit variance, sampled independently at every time-step .

Scaling limit interpretation 

The Ornstein–Uhlenbeck process can be interpreted as a scaling limit of a discrete process, in the same way that Brownian motion is a scaling limit of random walks. Consider an urn containing  blue and yellow balls. At each step a ball is chosen at random and replaced by a ball of the opposite colour. Let  be the number of blue balls in the urn after  steps. Then  converges in law to an Ornstein–Uhlenbeck process as  tends to infinity. This was obtained by Mark Kac.

Heuristically one may obtain this as follows.

Let , and we obtain the stochastic differential equation at the  limit.

Thus at the  limit, we have , with solution (assuming  distribution is standard normal) .

Applications

Noisy relaxation 
The Ornstein–Uhlenbeck process is a prototype of a noisy relaxation process. A canonical example is a Hookean spring (harmonic oscillator) with spring constant  whose dynamics is overdamped
with friction coefficient . In the presence of thermal fluctuations with temperature , the length  of the spring fluctuates around the spring rest length ; its stochastic dynamics is described by an Ornstein–Uhlenbeck process with

where  is derived from the Stokes–Einstein equation  for the effective diffusion constant. This model has been used to characterize the motion of a Brownian particle in an optical trap.

At equilibrium, the spring stores an average energy  in accordance with the equipartition theorem.

In financial mathematics 
The Ornstein–Uhlenbeck process is used in the Vasicek model of the interest rate. The Ornstein–Uhlenbeck process is one of several approaches used to model (with modifications) interest rates, currency exchange rates, and commodity prices stochastically. The parameter  represents the equilibrium or mean value supported by fundamentals;  the degree of volatility around it caused by shocks, and  the rate by which these stocks dissipate and the variable reverts towards the mean. One application of the process is a trading strategy known as pairs trade.

In evolutionary biology 
The Ornstein–Uhlenbeck process has been proposed as an improvement over a Brownian motion model for modeling the change in organismal phenotypes over time. A Brownian motion model implies that the phenotype can move without limit, whereas for most phenotypes natural selection imposes a cost for moving too far in either direction. A meta-analysis of 250 fossil phenotype time-series showed that an Ornstein–Uhlenbeck model was the best fit for 115 (46%) of the examined time series, supporting stasis as a common evolutionary pattern.  This said, there are certain challenges to its use: model selection mechanisms are often biased towards preferring an OU process without sufficient support, and misinterpretation is easy to the unsuspecting data scientist.

Generalizations 
It is possible to define a Lévy-driven Ornstein–Uhlenbeck process, in which the background driving process is a Lévy process instead of a Wiener process:

Here, the differential of the Wiener process  has been replaced with the differential of a Lévy process .

Higher dimensions

A multi-dimensional version of the Ornstein–Uhlenbeck process, denoted by the N-dimensional vector , can be defined from

The solution is

and the mean is

These expressions make use of the matrix exponential.

The process can also be described in terms of the probability density function , which satisfies the Fokker–Planck equation

As for the 1d case, the process is a linear transformation of Gaussian random variables, and therefore itself must be Gaussian. Because of this, the transition probability  is a Gaussian which can be written down explicitly.

where the matrix  is determined from the Lyapunov equation .

See also 
 Stochastic calculus
 Wiener process
 Gaussian process
 Mathematical finance
 The Vasicek model of interest rates
 Short-rate model
 Diffusion
 Fluctuation-dissipation theorem
 Klein–Kramers equation

Notes

References

External links 
A Stochastic Processes Toolkit for Risk Management, Damiano Brigo, Antonio Dalessandro, Matthias Neugebauer and Fares Triki
Simulating and Calibrating the Ornstein–Uhlenbeck process, M. A. van den Berg
Maximum likelihood estimation of mean reverting processes, Jose Carlos Garcia Franco
 

Stochastic differential equations
Markov processes
Variants of random walks